National Highway 158, commonly referred to as NH 158 is a national highway in  India. It is a spur road of National Highway 58. NH-158 traverses the state of Rajasthan in India.

Route 
Merta City, Lambia, Ras, Beawar, Badnor, Asind, Mandal.

Junctions  
 
  Terminal near Merta City.
  near Merta and Lambia.
  and 
  near Beawar.
  near Asind.
  Terminal near Mandal, Bhilwara.

See also 

 List of National Highways in India by highway number
 List of National Highways in India by state

References

External links 

 NH 158 on OpenStreetMap

National highways in India
National Highways in Rajasthan